David Saharuni (Dawit' Saharuni) was sparapet, curopalates, ishkhan, and presiding prince of Byzantine-controlled Armenia from 635 to 638.

David was a nakharar from the princely noble House of Saharuni. When the marzpan of Persarmania Varaztirots II Bagratuni was in the Byzantine imperial court in Osroene, he entered in a plot against emperor Heraclius organized by his illegitimate son John Athalarichos. David was also part of this plot. The attempt ultimately failed and Varaztirots was deported to an island near the coast of North Africa. David Saharuni was attacked by general and ruler of Byzantine Armenia, Mzhezh Gnuni but managed to evade capture and killed Mzhezh Gnuni, with the help of Gnuni's own troops, many of whom were Armenians sympathetic to Saharuni. David quickly obtained support from the local feudal lords, as a result Heraclius was forced to nominate David as curopalates. The historian John Katholikos adds that the Armenians nobles also gave him the title of Ishkhan of Armenia. Three years later the nobility overthrew Saharuni and Theodoros Rshtuni took his place as ruler of Armenia. The most detailed source covering the events of these years is historian Sebeos in his History of Heraclius.

References

External links
 Primary source: Sebeos' History of Heraclius, Chapter 29. Translated from Old Armenian by Robert Bedrosian

Sparapets
Year of birth missing
Year of death missing
7th-century rulers in Asia
Byzantine governors
7th-century Armenian people
David
Kouropalatai